The Night Is Ours (French: La nuit est à nous) is a 1953 French drama film directed by Jean Stelli and starring Simone Renant, Jean Danet and Jean Murat. It was a remake of the 1929 German film The Night Belongs to Us.

The film's sets were designed by Jacques Colombier.

Cast

See also
 The Night Belongs to Us (1929)
 The Night Is Ours (1930)

References

Bibliography 
 Dayna Oscherwitz & MaryEllen Higgins. The A to Z of French Cinema. Scarecrow Press, 2009.

External links 
 

1953 films
1953 drama films
French drama films
1950s French-language films
Films directed by Jean Stelli
French films based on plays
Remakes of German films
1950s French films